Wilfred Bagwell-Purefoy (13 June 1862 – 10 March 1930) was a British breeder of racehorses and a director of several companies.

The eldest son of Colonel Edward Bagwell-Purefoy of the Greenfields estate, County Tipperary, Wilfred Bagwell-Purefoy was educated at Harrow School and then at the Royal Military College, Sandhurst. On 10 May 1882 he joined the 3rd King's Own Hussars and served for six years with the rank of lieutenant. He resigned from the army to start a stud farm at Greenfields, County Tipperary. He was the director of the Autostrop Safety Razor Company, a competitor of Gillette.

He collected rare orchids and was interested in gardening and natural history, but his introduction to the British Isles of exotic plants and insects was denounced by naturalists.

Bagwell-Purefoy is chiefly remembered as one of a group of five gamblers who formed the Druid’s Lodge confederacy. The gamblers owned Hackler's Pride, winner of the Cambridgeshire Handicap in 1903 and again in 1904, yielding them a spectacular payoff.

References

External links
 

1862 births
1930 deaths
People educated at Harrow School
Graduates of the Royal Military College, Sandhurst
3rd The King's Own Hussars officers
British racehorse owners and breeders